On April 3, 2002, Alton "Buntry" McDonald, a member of the Mob Piru Bloods and a production manager at Death Row Records, was shot dead at a gas station in Compton. The murder was believed to be the result of fighting between two rival "sets" of the Bloods, the Mob Pirus and the Fruit Town Pirus.

Events

Background 
McDonald was a close friend of Suge Knight, the former CEO of Death Row Records and worked as a production manager at the record label. McDonald was also a friend of Tupac Shakur and was involved in the beating of Orlando Anderson on September 7, 1996, at the MGM Grand, which occurred several hours before Shakur was shot.

By 2002, a rivalry developed between two sets of the Bloods, the Mob Piru, which Death Row Records was affiliated with, and the Fruit Town Piru. Several associates of Death Row Records were killed as a result of this rivalry.

Shooting 
On April 3, 2002, McDonald was filling up his car at a gas station in Compton, when a pickup truck pulled up near him. One of the occupants opened fire with a handgun and McDonald was hit several times in the chest. He was taken to St. Francis Medical Center in Lynwood, where he died shortly after. Later that day, Suge Knight visited the hospital to pay his respects to McDonald's family.

Aftermath 
In January 2003, Gary "Gary G" Phillips, who was allegedly involved in the shooting of McDonald, was shot and wounded by two of Suge Knight's associates, Terran Andrews and Gregory Shelton.

Depictions in media 

 McDonald is mentioned in Tupac Shakur's song To Live and Die in L.A., from his album The Don Killuminati: The 7 Day Theory. 
 McDonald is portrayed in two episodes of Unsolved, where he is played by Calvin Tenner.

References 

2002 murders in the United States
April 2002 events in the United States
Bloods